George Lauder may refer to:
George Lauder (bishop) (died 1466), medieval Scottish bishop
George Lauder of the Bass (died 1611), Scottish Member of Parliament
George Lauder (surgeon) (1712–1752), Scottish surgeon
George Lauder Sr. (1815–1901), Scottish political leader 
George Lauder (industrialist) (1837–1924), Scottish industrialist, partner in the  Carnegie Steel Company
George V. Lauder (CIA) (1924–2012), American intelligence officer
George V. Lauder (biologist) (fl. 1970s–2002), American biologist

See also
George de Lawedre of Haltoun (1351–1426), Provost of Edinburgh